Jean Lyndsey Torren Marsh  (born 1 July 1934) is an English actress and writer. She co-created and starred in the ITV series Upstairs, Downstairs (1971–75), for which she won the 1975 Emmy Award for Outstanding Lead Actress in a Drama Series for her performance as Rose Buck. She later reprised the role in the BBC's revival of the series (2010–2012).

Marsh also co-created the television series The House of Eliott in 1991. Her film appearances include Cleopatra (1963), Frenzy (1972), The Changeling (1980), Return to Oz (1985), Willow (1988), Fatherland (1994) and Monarch (2000).

Early life
Marsh was born and grew up in Stoke Newington, London, the daughter of Emmeline Susannah Nightingale Poppy (née Bexley), a bar employee and dresser for the theatre, and Henry Charles John Marsh, an outdoor maintenance man and printer's assistant.

Career
During the 1950s and 1960s, Marsh made many appearances on British and American television, including an episode of The Twilight Zone called "The Lonely" (1959), in which she portrayed a lifelike robot; The Moon and Sixpence (1959) opposite Laurence Olivier and Denholm Elliott; The Wonderful World of Disney (1961); Gideon's Way (1965); I Spy (1967); in four episodes of The Saint (1964–1968); and one episode of UFO ("Exposed" 1970, as Janna). She was also a regular in the ITV series The Informer (1966–67) starring Ian Hendry.

Marsh has appeared several times in the BBC series Doctor Who. She first appeared alongside William Hartnell in the 1965 serial The Crusade as Lady Joanna, the sister of Richard I (The Lionheart). She returned later that year as companion Sara Kingdom in 9 episodes of the 12-part serial The Daleks' Master Plan. Marsh reprised the role in the audio plays Home Truths (2008), The Drowned World (2009), The Guardian of the Solar System (2010), The Five Companions (2011), The Anachronauts (2012), ‘’The Light At The End ‘’ (2013), An Ordinary Life (2014) and The Sontarans (2016). She also appeared in the 1989 television serial Battlefield as Morgaine, as well as the 2007 audio play The Wishing Beast. She made an un-billed cameo appearance in the 2013 docudrama about Doctor Who, An Adventure in Space and Time.

She featured as Bertha Mason Rochester in the George C. Scott-Susannah York version of Jane Eyre, directed by Delbert Mann. The film was released theatrically in the United Kingdom in 1970 and shown in the United States on NBC television in 1971.

Marsh's 2000 film about the death of Henry VIII, Monarch, was re-released in cinemas in 2014.

With Eileen Atkins, Marsh created the British period drama Upstairs, Downstairs and played the role of the house parlourmaid Rose Buck for the duration of the series, from 1971 until 1975. The programme was screened internationally and received numerous awards including two BAFTA awards, two Royal Television Society awards, eight Emmys and a Golden Globe. Marsh received a Royal Television Society award in 1971 and an Emmy Award for Outstanding Lead Actress for her role in 1975, and was nominated for the same award on three further occasions – 1974, 1976, and (for the show's revival) in 2011. She also received awards from the American Drama Centre and American Drama Critics Circle for the role, and two Golden Globe Award nominations.

She and Atkins created another television series, The House of Eliott, three series of which were broadcast between 1991 and 1994. This time, Marsh did not act in the series, but she did write some of the episodes.

Marsh's film credits include the Tony Hancock film The Rebel (1961), Cleopatra (1963) as Octavia, Unearthly Stranger (1964), Charlie Bubbles (1967), The Limbo Line (1968), Alfred Hitchcock's Frenzy (1972), Dark Places (1973), The Eagle Has Landed (1976), The Changeling (1980) and the fantasy films Return to Oz (1985) and Willow (1988). In 1994, she starred in a villain role in the Nickelodeon/Thames Television remake of The Tomorrow People. Her television films include Goliath Awaits (1981), See China and Die (1981), Master of the Game (1984), The Corsican Brothers (1985), A Connecticut Yankee in King Arthur's Court (1989), Fatherland (1994) for which she won a CableACE award for supporting actress, and The Pale Horse (1997). From 1982 to 1983, she portrayed the part of Roz Keith in the American sitcom 9 to 5.

Marsh served as the presenter for International Animation Festival, an American public television series featuring award-winning animated short films from around the world. The thirteen-part series was originally broadcast in 1975 on PBS.

From 2000 until 2002, Marsh appeared in The Ghost Hunter. Her many stage credits included the West End stage revival of Boeing Boeing at the Comedy Theatre in 2007 and in Peter Hall's production of The Portrait of a Lady in 2008. She made an appearance in the 2008 BBC adaptation of Jane Austen's Sense and Sensibility; played the recurring character Lizzie Galbraith alongside Joanna Lumley as Davina Jackson (the lead character) in Babycow Productions' Sensitive Skin which aired on BBC Two in 2005 and 2007. She appeared in BBC Four's Crooked House in December 2008 in a role especially written for her by Mark Gatiss.

A three-part revival of Upstairs, Downstairs was commissioned by the BBC with the first episode broadcast on BBC One on 26 December 2010. Marsh reprised her role as Rose Buck, who had returned to London to run an agency for domestic servants after a period spent nursing her mother in Suffolk. Eileen Atkins, who co-created the original series with Marsh, also starred in the revived series. It was set in the same London house as the original ITV series, 165 Eaton Place, resuming in 1936. Subsequently, a six-part second series was commissioned, and began transmission in February 2012 with Marsh's character appearing less frequently due to the stroke suffered by the actress.

Marsh has also written several books: Fiennders Abbey, The House of Eliott, and Iris.

Personal life
Marsh was married to the actor Jon Pertwee from 1955 until their divorce in 1960. She has had relationships with Albert Finney, Kenneth Haigh, and film director Michael Lindsay-Hogg.

On 3 October 2011, the BBC announced that Marsh had suffered a minor stroke and would miss the beginning of the second series of Upstairs, Downstairs. She was ultimately able to appear in only two scenes over the series. A third series was not commissioned.

Marsh was appointed Officer of the Order of the British Empire (OBE) in the 2012 Birthday Honours for services to drama.

Selected filmography

Lady Godiva Rides Again (1951) - Beauty Queen Contestant (uncredited)
The Limping Man (1953) - The Landlady's Daughter
The Love Lottery (1954) - Dancer in Sally's Dream (uncredited)
The Twilight Zone (1959) Episode: The Lonely - Alicia
The Rebel (1961) - Strange Woman at Party (uncredited)
The Roman Spring of Mrs. Stone (1961) - (uncredited)
Cleopatra (1963) - Octavia (uncredited)
Unearthly Stranger (1964) - Miss Ballard
Edgar Wallace Mysteries : Face of a Stranger (1964) - Grace Howard
Charlie Bubbles (1967) - Waitress (uncredited)
 The Limbo Line (1968)  - Dilys
A Day in the Death of Joe Egg (1972) - Woman on the Moon Rocket (uncredited)
Frenzy (1972) - Monica Barling
Dark Places (1973) - Victoria
The Eagle Has Landed (1976) - Joanna Grey
Hawaii Five-O
The Waltons (1977) Episode: "The Hiding Place" - Hilary von Kleist; (1978) Episode: "The Miracle Man" - Sister Harmony
The Changeling (1980) - Joanna Russell
"Doctor Who" (1989) - Season 26 Battlefield - Morgaine
Return to Oz (1985) - Nurse Wilson / Mombi
Tales from the Darkside (1985) - Joan Matlin ("Answer Me" episode)
Willow (1988) - Queen Bavmorda
Monarch (2000) - The Queens
The Heavy (2010) - Mrs. Mason 
Willow (2022) - Queen Bavmorda ("The Whispers of Nockmaar" episode) (Voice)

Books
Jean Marsh, The House of Eliott, Sidgwick & Jackson (November 1993), 978-0283061554; St Martin's Press (February 1994), 
Jean Marsh, Fiennders Keepers, Macmillan (1996), ; St Martin's Press (May 1997), 
Jean Marsh, Iris, St Martin's Press (July 2000), ; Macmillan (February 2003), 
Jean Marsh, Fiennders Abbey, Pan (5 August 2011),

References

External links

Jean Marsh(Aveleyman)

1934 births
Living people
People from Stoke Newington
Outstanding Performance by a Lead Actress in a Drama Series Primetime Emmy Award winners
English film actresses
English television actresses
Officers of the Order of the British Empire
20th-century English actresses
21st-century English actresses